
Gmina Krobia is an urban-rural gmina (administrative district) in Gostyń County, Greater Poland Voivodeship, in west-central Poland.

Villages
Apart from the town of Krobia, Gmina Krobia contains the villages and settlements of Bukownica, Chumiętki, Chwałkowo, Ciołkowo, Dębina, Domachowo, Florynki, Gogolewo, Grabianowo, Karzec, Kuczyna, Kuczynka, Niepart, Pijanowice, Posadowo, Potarzyca, Przyborowo, Pudliszki, Rogowo, Stara Krobia, Sułkowice, Wymysłowo, Ziemlin and Żychlewo.

Neighbouring gminas
Gmina Krobia is bordered by the gminas of Gostyń, Miejska Górka, Pępowo, Piaski and Poniec.

References
Polish official population figures 2006

Krobia
Gostyń County